Sir Kenneth Macfarlane Gresson  (18 July 1891 – 7 October 1974) was a New Zealand soldier, lawyer, university lecturer and judge. He was born on 18 July 1891 and attended Rangi Ruru. His father, John Beatty Gresson, was a solicitor in Christchurch, who died in a railway accident a few months before Kenneth Macfarlane Gresson was born. His grandfather, Henry Barnes Gresson, was one of New Zealand's first Supreme Court judges. 
He was buried in a family grave at St Paul's Anglican Church, Papanui.

References

1891 births
1974 deaths

New Zealand academics
District Court of New Zealand judges
Court of Appeal of New Zealand judges
People from Christchurch
People educated at Rangi Ruru Girls' School
Burials at St Paul's Cemetery, Christchurch
New Zealand Knights Commander of the Order of the British Empire
New Zealand members of the Privy Council of the United Kingdom
20th-century New Zealand judges